Geldon may refer to:

A long spear used by the Flemish militias, notably at the Battle of the Golden Spurs
The dragon Geldon from South Park